Szeghalom is a district in northern part of Békés County. Szeghalom is also the name of the town where the district seat is found. The district is located in the Southern Great Plain Statistical Region.

Geography 
Szeghalom District borders with Püspökladány District (Hajdú-Bihar County) to the north, Berettyóújfalu District (Hajdú-Bihar County) and Sarkad District to the east, Békés District to the south, Gyomaendrőd District and Karcag District (Jász-Nagykun-Szolnok County) to the west. The number of the inhabited places in Szeghalom District is 7.

Municipalities 
The district has 4 towns and 3 villages.
(ordered by population, as of 1 January 2012)

The bolded municipalities are cities.

Demographics

In 2011, it had a population of 29,709 and the population density was 42/km².

Ethnicity
Besides the Hungarian majority, the main minorities are the Roma (approx. 1,200) and German (100).

Total population (2011 census): 29,709
Ethnic groups (2011 census): Identified themselves: 26,835 persons:
Hungarians: 25,436 (94.79%)
Gypsies: 1,136 (4.23%)
Others and indefinable: 263 (0.98%)
Approx. 3,000 persons in Szeghalom District did not declare their ethnic group at the 2011 census.

Religion
Religious adherence in the county according to 2011 census:

Reformed – 7,620;
Catholic – 2,354 (Roman Catholic – 2,325; Greek Catholic – 29);
Evangelical – 93;
other religions – 348; 
Non-religious – 12,865; 
Atheism – 244;
Undeclared – 6,185.

Gallery

See also
List of cities and towns of Hungary

References

External links
 Postal codes of the Szeghalom District

Districts in Békés County